Kłodzin may refer to the following places:
Kłodzin, Greater Poland Voivodeship (west-central Poland)
Kłodzin, Warmian-Masurian Voivodeship (north Poland)
Kłodzin, West Pomeranian Voivodeship (north-west Poland)